Eileen H. McNulty was the Pennsylvania Secretary of Revenue, having been nominated by Pennsylvania Governor Tom Wolf and confirmed by the Pennsylvania Senate in June 2015. She formerly served as Pennsylvania Secretary of Revenue from 1991 to 1995 in the Cabinet of Pennsylvania Governor Robert P. Casey. McNulty graduated cum laude from Michigan State University with a B.A. in economics. She served in the Pennsylvania Office of the Budget from 2011 until 2013.

References

Living people
State cabinet secretaries of Pennsylvania
Michigan State University alumni
Tax commissioners
Year of birth missing (living people)